Rajeev Govinda Pillai is an Indian actor from Malayalam cinema.  His acting debut was in the movie City of God directed by Lijo Jose Pellissery (2011) where he played one of the heroes. His popularity further increased with the stellar performances in Celebrity Cricket League where he single-handedly carried his state team to many victories .

Pillai is originally a dentist, the fashion bug bit him while doing his masters in London. After leaving dentistry he left for Mumbai to follow a career in fashion. His successful run in the fashion industry motivated many Kerala youth to take up modelling as he is still considered as the pioneer in the industry from Kerala. He still remains the only model from Kerala who has worked in Paris, the fashion capital of the world. In 2011 he debuted in movies with Lijo Jose Pellissery's City of God (2011 film) as one of the leads. It was his 32nd audition which eventually gave him success. He represented Kerala Strikers Cricket team in CCL and was the Captain before. Of the six seasons Kerala Strikers played, he top scored five times winning ten "Man of the match" awards and the most coveted best batsman of tournament in 2017. He also represented Kerala twice in Celebrity Badminton League.

Early life 

Born in a village called Nannoor in the south of Kerala, Rajeev had the childhood of any village kid. His father worked in Muscat and mother worked as Sanskrit teacher in the school he studied. After finishing his tenth grade from National high school as topper of the school, he moved to NSS Hindu College, Changanassery for his pre degree. He joined Bachelor of Dental Surgery in KVG Dental College, Sullia.

Career
In 2011, Rajeev made his acting debut as the lead role in the film City of God, which was directed by Lijo Jose Pellissery.

Before making the debut in movies he had a successful run in all the major fashion weeks in India and did model for a few international brands as well. After a stint in the theatre in Mumbai he decided to try his luck in movies .

Rajeev Pillai has played for Kerala Strikers team in the 2012 to 2017 seasons of the Celebrity Cricket League.

Rajeev's mantra for health is that there are no shortcuts to 'get fit quick', and encourages enthusiasts to take up mixed martial arts (MMA). His fitness regimen involves jiujitsu, capoeira, karate, boxing and CrossFit. He underlines the fact that his workout mantra also involves a healthy and controlled diet. Whenever he hits the gym, he focuses on 45 minutes to 2 hours of weight training to keep his body fat content below 10 per cent.

Rajeev's dedication to fitness has resulted in his sculpted physique and chiselled abs, winning him accolades and a considerable fan following. As a result, he has figured in the "Kochi Most Desirable" list published by The Times of India, in their polls for 5 consecutive years, from 2012 to 2016.

Awards 
 Asiavision Awards
 2016 – Asiavision Movie Awards – special Jury Award, Oru Muthassi Gadha

Filmography

References

External links 
 https://hyenakeysed.com/rajeev_pillai
 http://indianterminal.com/forum/chillujalakam/91729-hottie-on-the-ramp-interview-with-model-and-upcoming-actor-rajeev-govinda-pillai.html
 https://basketballhunter.com/

Male actors in Malayalam cinema
Indian male film actors
Male actors from Kerala
Male actors from Pathanamthitta
Living people
1982 births
People from Thiruvalla
21st-century Indian male actors